Glacier Peak ( to ) is in the Beartooth Mountains in the U.S. state of Montana. The peak is one of the tallest in the Beartooth Mountains and is in the Absaroka-Beartooth Wilderness, on the border of Custer and Gallatin National Forests.

References

Glacier
Beartooth Mountains